Budhanilkantha is a municipality in Kathmandu district of Nepal.

Budhanilkantha may also refer to:
 Budhanilkantha School, a school in Kathmandu district of Nepal
 Budhanilkantha Temple, a temple in Kathmandu district of Nepal